James J. Eisenhower (born January 30, 1958) is an American lawyer and judge from the Commonwealth of Pennsylvania. He is a judge on the Pennsylvania Court of Judicial Discipline. He also serves Of Counsel at Philadelphia law firm Dilworth Paxson LLP. His practice centers around white collar criminal defense, internal investigations, compliance, ethics and campaign finance matters.

Education 
James earned a B.A. from Temple University and a J.D. degree from Antioch School of Law. He earned a Master of Philosophy from Oxford University where he was a Marshall Scholar.  His Master's thesis concerned an examination of the philosophical concept of the rule of law and British emergency powers in Northern Ireland.   He studied under Geoffrey Marshall, Joe Raz and Ronald Dworkin.  James serves on the Board of the Association of Marshall Scholars and recently attended as a delegate the British sponsored Atlantic Forum on the "special relationship" between the UK and the United States.

Personal life 
James is married to Nora Dowd Eisenhower. They have two children.

He is a distant relative of Dwight D. Eisenhower.

He is an amateur guitar player, and was known to play during campaign events, even playing a guitar solo with Philadelphia indie rock band Cecil B. during a "Jammin' for Jim" rally at University of Pennsylvania.

Legal career 
James began his legal career as an Assistant United States Attorney for the Eastern District of Pennsylvania and as a trial attorney for the United States Department of Justice Civil Rights Division.[3] 

James is of counsel at the Philadelphia law firm Dilworth Paxson LLP where he focuses his practice on government and regulatory matters and white-collar criminal defense.  He has been named to the "Best Lawyers in America" list many times including in 2022.  James has represented public officials in federal and state ethics investigations, advised clients in federal, state and local campaign finance matters, and has represented the Pennsylvania Gaming Control Board, as well a national financial institution in Philadelphia and Pennsylvania regulatory matters.

Some of his major representations include:

In 2006, he led a team of attorneys representing Don Barden in his winning the Pittsburgh gaming license.  Barden was the sole minority awardee for a Pennsylvania gaming license.  

In 2011, James was lead counsel in representing the Pennsylvania Gaming Control Board in the revocation of the Foxwoods gaming license resulting in a $50 million forfeiture to the Commonwealth. This was the largest gaming related forfeiture in the history of the Commonwealth.

In 2017, he represented the former chief of staff to Governor Ed Rendell in a federal criminal matter.

In 2019, James represented US Congressman Bob Brady in a federal criminal investigation.  

James is also an assistant professor at Temple University School of Law.  He teaches Jurisprudence, the Philosophy of Law, and US Election law.

Government career
James served as former Pennsylvania Governor Ed Rendell's chief criminal justice advisor during Rendell's 2002 gubernatorial election. After Rendell's election, Eisenhower served on the "Governor's Cabinet for Children and Families" within the Pennsylvania Department of Public Welfare. From 1994 to 1997 he served as Chief Counsel of the Police Advisory Commission of Philadelphia.

In 2005, Rendell named him Chairman of the Pennsylvania Intergovernmental Cooperation Authority, the inter-governmental body that regulates finances for the city of Philadelphia. During the governorship of Rendell, James also chaired the Pennsylvania Commission on Crime and Delinquency (PCCD), the commonwealth's lead agency for criminal justice, children delinquency prevention and the protection of victims of crime.

In 2019, Governor Tom Wolf appointed James to the Pennsylvania Court of Judicial Discipline.  He is currently President Judge of the 8 member Court.

Political career
In 2014, James served on the finance committee for Pennsylvania Governor Candidate Tom Wolf, who was elected and took office in 2015. 

In May 2011, he was named to the Board of Directors for Congreso, a Philadelphia-based and nationally recognized multi-service organization. Congreso's goal is to alleviate poverty and promote economic self-sufficiency to ensure that our most vulnerable populations have the educational credentials and workforce skills to compete in a global economy.

In 2008, James was surrogate speaker and primary Election Day counsel for Hillary Clinton. Later that year, he served as general election federal court counsel for Barack Obama.

From 2007 through 2011 he served as the chair of the Pennsylvania Intergovernmental Cooperation Authority (PICA), the state authority that oversees the finances of the city of Philadelphia.

James was the Democratic nominee for the 2000 Pennsylvania Attorney General election and the 2004 Pennsylvania Attorney General election.  He won the Democratic primary twice against John Morganelli (2000, 2004) and David Barasch (2004). He narrowly lost the 2004 general election to future Pennsylvania Governor Tom Corbett.

In 2003, he was named to the "Power 75" list of politically influential people in Pennsylvania by the Pennsylvania Report.

Public service
James served on the White House staff at the National Security Council during the presidency of Bill Clinton. He authored PDD 42, the presidential decision directive on international crime and the executive order that seized the assets of the Colombian Cali Cartel.

Representative Experience 
 Represented the Chief of Staff to the Democratic Leader of the House in the Pennsylvania "Bonusgate matter".
 Represented several members of Congress in campaign finance and federal investigations.
 Represented the former Chief of Staff to Governor Ed Rendell in a federal investigation.
 Represented the Pennsylvania Gaming Control Board in the forfeiture of the Foxwoods Gaming License, resulting in a 50 million dollar forfeiture to the Commonwealth, the largest gaming related forfeiture in the history of Pennsylvania.
 Handled matters related to the Foreign Corrupt Practices Act (FCPA) and involving wiretaps authorized by Title III of the federal criminal code.
 Represented US Congressman Bob Brady in a federal criminal investigation.

Awards and recognition
 Edward J. McLaughlin Award for Distinguished Service to Victims, Victim/Witness Services of South Philadelphia, 2009
 Eisenhower Fellow, 2002
 White House Fellow, 1995
 Sustained Superior Performance of Duty Award – US Department of Justice, 1992
 Certificate of Commendation for Outstanding Performance in the Activities of the Civil Rights Division, US Department of Justice, 1988
 Honors Recruit – US Department of Justice, 1987
 Marshall Scholar, 1982

References 

LinkedIn Profile

1958 births
Living people
Pennsylvania Democrats
Pennsylvania lawyers
Temple University alumni
Alumni of the University of Oxford
David A. Clarke School of Law alumni